Charles Hunt (1803 – 15 November 1877) was an English painter. He is known for having painted both historical subjects as well as humorous paintings, especially ones with naughty children.

He was the father of Charles Hunt Jr (1829 to 1900), also a well known painter at the time.

References 

1803 births
1877 deaths
19th-century English painters